Apple bobbing, also known as bobbing for apples, is a game often played on Halloween. The game is played by filling a tub or a large basin with water and putting apples in the water. Because apples are less dense than water, they will float at the surface. Players (usually children) then try to catch one with their teeth. Use of arms is not allowed, and the hands are often tied behind the back to prevent cheating.

In Scotland, this may be called "dooking" (i.e., ducking). In northern England, the game is often called apple ducking or duck-apple. In Ireland and  Newfoundland and Labrador, "Snap Apple Night" is a synonym for Halloween. Another variation involves using the mouth to drop a Fork from above to 'catch' the apple.

While bobbing for apples was most common, other parties would instead bob for nuts (most commonly hazel or chestnut) or specie.

Apple on a String

A common variant of bobbing of apples is the game snap apple or apple on a string, in which apples are hung from the ceiling and contestants jump to take bites - the winner is the contestant that manages to eat their entire apple first. To increase the difficulty, it is common to spin the apples beforehand or shake the cords, often catching contestants who are unaware or too slow in the face.

History
The tradition of bobbing for apples dates back to the Roman invasion of Britain, when the conquering army merged their own celebrations with traditional Celtic festivals. During an annual celebration, young unmarried people try to bite into an apple floating in water or hanging from a string on a line; the first person to bite into the apple would be the next one to be allowed to marry. Apple bobbing was appropriated in the Irish festival Samhain, with apples a sign of fertility and abundance.

Both apple bobbing and apple on a string are mentioned in 18th century Ireland by Charles Vallancey in his book Collectanea de Rebus Hibernicis.

A maiden who placed the apple she bobbed under her pillow was said to dream of her future sweetheart.
In North East England, bobbing apple is called dookie (ducking) apple.

Health risks
The use of communal buckets, in which saliva and nasal mucus may come into contact with the water, is a risk factor for the spread of pathogens. In light of the COVID-19 pandemic, safer alternatives have been proposed, such as using separate bowls for each participant.

See also
 Snap-dragon (game)

References

Halloween practices
Party games